Tenghori Arrondissement  is an arrondissement of the Bignona Department in the Ziguinchor Region of Senegal.

Subdivisions
The arrondissement is divided administratively into 4 rural communities (communautés rurales) and in turn into villages.

Communautés rurales :

Arrondissements of Senegal
Ziguinchor Region
Populated places in the Bignona Department